There are at least 68 named lakes and reservoirs in Powell County, Montana.

Lakes
 Bear Lake, el. 
 Beaver Pond, el. 
 Beaver Pond, el. 
 Big Knife Lakes, el. 
 Braziel Lake, el. 
 Browns Lake, el. 
 Caruthers Lake, el. 
 Chimney Lakes, el. 
 Coopers Lake, el. 
 Crimson Lake, el. 
 Deadmans Lake, el. 
 Dolus Lakes, el. 
 Doney Lake, el. 
 Elbow Lake, el. 
 Evans Lake, el. 
 Hagan Pond, el. 
 James Lake, el. 
 Jones Lake, el. 
 Kleinschmidt Lake, el. 
 Lahrity Lake, el. 
 Lake Otatsy, el. 
 Lena Lake, el. 
 Lilly Lake, el. 
 Little Goat Lake, el. 
 Moose Lake, el. 
 Morrell Lake, el. 
 Mud Lake, el. 
 Nolo Lake, el. 
 Otis Lake, el. 
 Perkins Pond, el. 
 Powell Lake, el. 
 Prisoner Lake, el. 
 Pyramid Lake, el. 
 Reservoir Lake, el. 
 Rice Lake, el. 
 Ryan Lake, el. 
 Shoup Lake, el. 
 Slate Lake, el. 
 Spawn Lake, el. 
 Trask Lakes, el. 
 Tupper Lake, el. 
 Upper Elliot Lake, el. 
 Upsata Lake, el.

Reservoirs
 Bandy Reservoir, el. 
 Bohn Lake, el. 
 Bowman Lakes, el. 
 Caruthers Lake, el. 
 Conleys Lake, el. 
 Doney Lake, el. 
 Goat Lake, el. 
 Kerns Lake, el. 
 Lois Lake, el. 
 Lower Bowman Lake, el. 
 Lower Elliot Lake, el. 
 Lower Taylor Reservoir, el. 
 Lynn Reservoir, el. 
 Martin Lake, el. 
 Middle Bowman Lake, el. 
 Miller Lake, el. 
 Mountain Ben Lake, el. 
 Mud Lake, el. 
 Nevada Lake, el. 
 Powell Reservoirs, el. 
 Rock Creek Lake, el. 
 Tin Cup Lake, el. 
 Upper Bowman Lake, el. 
 Upper Taylor Reservoir, el. 
 Wales Creek Reservoir, el.

See also
 List of lakes in Montana

Notes

Bodies of water of Powell County, Montana
Powell